Chea Poch  (born 2 January 1974) is a Cambodian politician. He belongs to the Sam Rainsy Party and was elected to represent Prey Veng Province in the National Assembly of Cambodia in 2003.

References

1974 births 
Members of the National Assembly (Cambodia)
Candlelight Party politicians
Cambodia National Rescue Party politicians 
Living people